Wine of Heaven is the seventh album of the Italian heavy metal band Mastercastle.

History
The album was recorded starting from January 2016 and was finished in January 2017 at MusicArt studios. (Genoa, Italy), but the composition began on 2015. As for the previous album Enfer (De La Bibliothèque Nationale), the producer was Pier Gonella.

Lyrics
All lyrics were written by Giorgia Gueglio that consider ‘Wine Of Heaven’ as “a journey through the aroma of the “Nectar of the Gods”, wandering among the meanderings of the mind, discovering the flavor of life, loneliness and passion” but the album is not considered as a concept album about.

Track listing

Line up
 Giorgia Gueglio – voice
 Pier Gonella – guitars
 Steve Vawamas – bass
 Alessio Spallarossa – drums

References

External links
 Mastercastle – Official site of the band
 Mastercastle – Official facebook site of the band

2010 albums
Mastercastle albums